Andrea Bliss (born 5 October 1980) is a Jamaican athlete who specialises in the 100 metres hurdles. She represented her country at the 2013 World Championships reaching the semifinals. In addition, she finished fourth at the 2010 Commonwealth Games.

Personal bests
She has personal bests of 12.82 seconds in the 100 metres hurdles (Kingston 2013) and 8.08 seconds in the 60 metres hurdles (Düsseldorf 2006).

Competition record

References

External links

1980 births
Living people
Jamaican female hurdlers
Sportspeople from Kingston, Jamaica
Athletes (track and field) at the 2010 Commonwealth Games
Central American and Caribbean Games silver medalists for Jamaica
Central American and Caribbean Games bronze medalists for Jamaica
Competitors at the 2006 Central American and Caribbean Games
Competitors at the 2010 Central American and Caribbean Games
Central American and Caribbean Games medalists in athletics
Commonwealth Games competitors for Jamaica